The Waikoau River is a river in southern Fiordland, New Zealand. Rising north of the Hump Ridge, it flows south-eastward into Te Waewae Bay.

See also
List of rivers of New Zealand

References

Rivers of Fiordland